Shirur Kasar is a tehsil in the Beed subdivision of the Beed district, in the Indian state of Maharashtra. The town is situated on the southern bank of the river Sindafana, a tributary of the Godavari River. Shirur Kasar obtained Tehsil status in 1999. Prior to that it was part of the tehsil Patoda, which is also a subdivision of the Beed district. Weekly Rashtra Nirman is one of the popular newspapers.

Villages 
The villages in this tehsil include Gomalwada, Shindfana (Hingewadi), Rakshas Bhuwan, Vighanwadi, Kholewadi, Loni, Manur, Kolwadi, Warni, Bawi, and Padali.  

Cities and towns in Beed district
Talukas in Maharashtra
Beed district